Shanks's square forms factorization is a method for integer factorization devised by Daniel Shanks as an improvement on Fermat's factorization method.

The success of Fermat's method depends on finding integers  and  such that , where  is the integer to be factored. An improvement (noticed by Kraitchik) is to look for integers  and  such that .

A practical algorithm for finding pairs  which satisfy  was developed by Shanks, who named it Square Forms Factorization or SQUFOF. The algorithm can be expressed in terms of continued fractions or in terms of quadratic forms. Although there are now much more efficient factorization methods available, SQUFOF has the advantage that it is small enough to be implemented on a programmable calculator.

In 1858, the Czech mathematician Václav Šimerka used a method similar to SQUFOF to factor     .

Algorithm
Input: , the integer to be factored, which must be neither a prime number nor a perfect square, and a small multiplier .

The algorithm:

Initialize 

Repeat

until  is a perfect square at some even .

Initialize 

Repeat

until 

Shanks's method has time complexity .

Stephen S. McMath wrote
a more detailed discussion of the mathematics of Shanks's method,
together with a proof of its correctness.

Example

Let 

Here  is a perfect square.

Here .

Thus,

Example implementations
Below is an example of C function for performing SQUFOF factorization on unsigned integer not larger than 64 bits, without overflow of the transient operations. 

#include <inttypes.h>
#define nelems(x) (sizeof(x) / sizeof((x)[0]))

const int multiplier[] = {1, 3, 5, 7, 11, 3*5, 3*7, 3*11, 5*7, 5*11, 7*11, 3*5*7, 3*5*11, 3*7*11, 5*7*11, 3*5*7*11};

uint64_t SQUFOF( uint64_t N )
{
    uint64_t D, Po, P, Pprev, Q, Qprev, q, b, r, s;
    uint32_t L, B, i;
    s = (uint64_t)(sqrtl(N)+0.5);
    if (s*s == N) return s;
    for (int k = 0; k < nelems(multiplier) && N <= UINT64_MAX/multiplier[k]; k++) {
        D = multiplier[k]*N;
        Po = Pprev = P = sqrtl(D);
        Qprev = 1;
        Q = D - Po*Po;
        L = 2 * sqrtl( 2*s );
        B = 3 * L;
        for (i = 2 ; i < B ; i++) {
            b = (uint64_t)((Po + P)/Q);
            P = b*Q - P;
            q = Q;
            Q = Qprev + b*(Pprev - P);
            r = (uint64_t)(sqrtl(Q)+0.5);
            if (!(i & 1) && r*r == Q) break;
            Qprev = q;
            Pprev = P;
        };
        if (i >= B) continue;
        b = (uint64_t)((Po - P)/r);
        Pprev = P = b*r + P;
        Qprev = r;
        Q = (D - Pprev*Pprev)/Qprev;
        i = 0;
        do {
            b = (uint64_t)((Po + P)/Q);
            Pprev = P;
            P = b*Q - P;
            q = Q;
            Q = Qprev + b*(Pprev - P);
            Qprev = q;
            i++;
        } while (P != Pprev);
        r = gcd(N, Qprev);
        if (r != 1 && r != N) return r;
    }
    return 0;
}

References

External links 
 Daniel Shanks: Analysis and Improvement of the Continued Fraction Method of Factorization, (transcribed by S. McMath 2004)
 Daniel Shanks: SQUFOF Notes, (transcribed by S. McMath 2004)
 Stephen S. McMath: Parallel integer factorization using quadratic forms, 2005
 S. McMath, F. Crabbe, D. Joyner: Continued fractions and parallel SQUFOF, 2005
 Jason Gower, Samuel Wagstaff: Square Form Factorisation (Published)
 Shanks's SQUFOF Factoring Algorithm
java-math-library

Integer factorization algorithms